Husainabad Clock Tower is a clock tower located in the Lucknow city of India. It was constructed in 1881 by Hussainabad Trust to mark the arrival of Sir George Couper, the first lieutenant governor of the United Province of Avadh. It was built at a cost of Rs. 1.75 lakhs.

History
It is located adjacent to the Rumi Darwaza, Bada Imambada and Teele Wali Masjid.
Built in the year 1881, Husainabad Clock Tower is adjudged as the tallest among all the clock towers in India. it was built as a replica of the Big Ben clock tower of London.

Richard Roskell Bayne designed this structure,  in height, and it reflects Victorian and Gothic style structural designs. Gunmetal is used for building the clock parts. Its gigantic pendulum has a length of 14 feet, and the dial of the clock is designed in the shape of a 12-fully gold flower and bells around it.

Clock tower

In 2010, the district administration decided to replace the clock. But then two samaritans Captain Paritosh Chauhan and Akhilesh Agarwal approached the administration to allow them to repair it so that the mechanical clock is not replaced with an electronic one. It was Captain Chauhan's passion and love for his city that he requested the then DM, Amit Ghosh to give him a chance to repair it. They worked on it for three years and reconstructed the entire clock on a pro bono basis.

On 13 April 2010, they began working and were able to make the defunct clock functional by 28 October 2010. Finally, on 13 September 2011, they made the giant clock tower chime, after a silence of 27 long years.

References

Clock towers in India
Buildings and structures in Lucknow
Tourist attractions in Lucknow
1881 establishments in India